The iQue Player (stylised as iQue PLAYER) is a handheld TV game version of the Nintendo 64 console that was manufactured by iQue, a joint venture between Nintendo and  Taiwanese-American scientist Wei Yen after China had banned the sale of home video games. Its Chinese name is Shén Yóu Ji (神游机), literally "Divine Gaming Machine". Shényóu (神游) is a double entendre as "to make a mental journey". It was never released in any English-speaking countries, but the name "iQue Player" appears in the instruction manual. The console and its controller are one unit, plugging directly into the television. A box accessory allows multiplayer gaming.

History

Development
China has a large black market for video games and usually only a few games officially make it to the Chinese market. Many Chinese gamers tend to purchase pirated cartridge or disc copies or download copied game files to play via emulator. Nintendo wanted to curb software piracy in China, and bypass the ban that the Chinese government has implemented on home game consoles since 2000. Nintendo partnered with Wei Yen, who had led past Nintendo product development such as the Nintendo 64 console and the Wii Remote. Originally, the system would support games released on Nintendo consoles prior to the GameCube, including the NES, Super NES, and Nintendo 64, but it was decided only to include Nintendo 64 games. Additionally, The Legend of Zelda: Majora's Mask was planned and is shown on the back of the box, but was later cancelled.

The iQue Player was announced at Tokyo Game Show 2003. It was originally planned to play Super NES in addition to Nintendo 64 games, and had a release date set for mid-October with debut markets including Shanghai, Guangzhou, and Chengdu, expanding into the rest of China by the following spring. The system missed its mid-October launch. By November 21, it was available for purchase at Lik Sang.

Release
The iQue Player was released on November 18, 2003 with few launch games. Nintendo's strategy to market games in China was to show how video games can help improve children's mental and social development. However, the launch was not successful. The total estimated sales was between 8,000 and 12,000 units. At first, the only way to get games was via the iQue Depot, but in 2004, Nintendo released iQue@Home to download at home. The last game, Animal Crossing (动物森林, Animal Forest) was released in 2006.

Discontinuation
On October 31, 2016, iQue reported that iQue@Home service would be discontinued by the end of December 2016. The service was gradually phased out until the content distribution servers went offline in 2018.

Technical details

The iQue Player is a size-reduced Nintendo 64 console, using system-on-a-chip technology. It plays Nintendo 64 games specifically ported to the system.

 Processor: R-4300i 64-bit CPU, 140.625 MHz
 Memory: 16 MB DDR (8 MB available)
 Graphics: 100,000 polygons/second, 2.09 million colors
 Sound: ADPCM 64

Games
The iQue Player's library has 14 games, light conversions from past releases for the Nintendo 64 in Europe, North America, and Japan. One game was canceled, The Legend of Zelda: Majora's Mask and another, a Traditional Chinese version of The Legend of Zelda: Ocarina of Time, was completed but never announced.

iQue Player games differ slightly from their Nintendo 64 counterparts, with the text and voices having been translated to Mandarin. The only exceptions are the Mario games and the previously Japan-only Sin and Punishment, where the text has been translated but the voices remain in English. Many glitches and errors from the original games have been fixed. Some features were removed due to the system's lack of support for Nintendo 64 controller accessories like the Rumble Pak. Some features were added, and many games that allow the player to enter their name now have the option to use their iQue Player's username. Speedruns of several games, such as Super Mario 64 and Star Fox 64, are sometimes carried out on the iQue Player due to quicker loading times and faster scrolling text than the Nintendo 64 versions.
Nintendo had plans to support network multiplayer in games that originally only support local multiplayer, which would work in a similar manner to that of an emulator.

See also
Video gaming in China

References

External links

iQue Player website  
iQue@Home page  

Nintendo 64
IQue
Products introduced in 2003
Discontinued video game consoles
IQue consoles
Online video game services